"Hit It from the Back" is the second and final single from Mobb Deep's Juvenile Hell album. It was released under 4th & Broadway, from which the duo was dropped due to poor record sales, barely selling 20,000 at the time. The single reached number 18 on the Billboard Rap chart.

Track listing
Side A
"Hit It from the Back" [Clean version]

Side B
"Hit It from the Back" [LP version]
"Hit It from the Back" [Instrumental]

References

1993 singles
1993 songs
Mobb Deep songs
Songs written by Havoc (musician)
Songs written by Prodigy (rapper)
4th & B'way Records singles